Hot Country Songs is a chart that ranks the top-performing country music songs in the United States, published by Billboard magazine.  In 1968, 24 different singles topped the chart, then published under the title Hot Country Singles, in 52 issues of the magazine, based on playlists submitted by country music radio stations and sales reports submitted by stores.

At the start of the year the number-one single was "For Loving You" by Bill Anderson and Jan Howard, its third week in the top spot.  It remained at number one until the issue dated January 20, when it was replaced by Merle Haggard's single "Sing Me Back Home".  Haggard spent the highest number of weeks at number one in 1968, topping the chart for a total of eight weeks with "Sing Me Back Home", "The Legend of Bonnie and Clyde" and "Mama Tried".  He was one of three artists to take three different singles to number one during the year, the most by any act.  Sonny James reached number one with "A World of Our Own", "Heaven Says Hello" and "Born To Be With You", and Tammy Wynette topped the chart with "Take Me to Your World", "D-I-V-O-R-C-E" and "Stand by Your Man".  The longest run at number one by a single was the five weeks which Henson Cargill spent in the top spot with "Skip a Rope" in February and March.  Two of 1968's country number ones also topped Billboards all-genre singles chart, the Hot 100.  Bobby Goldsboro's single "Honey" had already had a run atop the Hot 100 when it reached number one on the country chart in May.  Jeannie C. Riley's "Harper Valley PTA" topped the Hot 100 in September and reached the peak position on the country chart the following week.  Although it did not achieve the same level of crossover success, Wynette's November chart-topper "Stand by Your Man" has come to be regarded as one of the greatest country songs of all time.  In 2003 it topped a poll of critics, journalists and industry insiders to find the top song of the genre, and in 2010 the song was added by the Library of Congress to the National Recording Registry, which selects recordings annually that are "culturally, historically, or aesthetically significant".

In the issue of Billboard dated October 19, Eddy Arnold, one of the most successful country singers of the preceding 20 years, achieved his final number one with "Then You Can Tell Me Goodbye".  The single was his 28th number one on Billboards country charts (including Hot Country Singles and its predecessor charts), a record at the time.  Two weeks later Arnold was replaced in the top spot when Conway Twitty reached number one for the first time with his single "Next in Line".  A former rock and roll singer who had turned to country music in the mid-1960s, Twitty would remain a fixture at the top of the country charts for two decades, and set a new record for the most country chart-toppers when he achieved his 29th number one in 1980.  Twitty would ultimately take 40 singles to the top of the chart from 1968 to 1986, a record which would stand until 2006, when George Strait topped the chart for the 41st time.  In addition to Twitty, four other acts reached number one on the Hot Country chart for the first time in 1968: Henson Cargill, Jeannie C. Riley, Bobby Goldsboro and Glen Campbell.  Of these four acts, only Campbell would go on to top the chart again, and he did so before the end of 1968, when his single "Wichita Lineman" was the final number one of the year.

Chart history

See also
1968 in music
1968 in country music
List of artists who reached number one on the U.S. country chart

References

1968
Country
1968 record charts